Sabeer Bhatia (born 30 December 1968) is an Indian businessman who co-founded the first free web-based email service, Hotmail.com in 1996.

Career 
Bhatia briefly worked for Apple Computer, as a hardware engineer and Firepower Systems Inc. He, along with his colleague Jack Smith, set up Hotmail on 4 July 1996, American Independence Day, symbolizing "freedom" from ISP-based e-mail and the ability to access a user's inbox from anywhere in the world.

As president and CEO, Bhatia led Hotmail until its eventual acquisition by Microsoft in 1998 for an estimated $400 million. Bhatia worked at Microsoft for one year after the Hotmail acquisition and in April 1999, left Microsoft to start another venture, Arzoo Inc, an e-commerce firm with investment from Mohammed Asif, a top Indian-American banker at JP Morgan.

Bhatia started a free messaging service called JaxtrSMS. He said that JaxtrSMS would do to SMS what Hotmail did for e-mail. Claiming it to be a disruptive technology, he says that the operators will lose revenue on the reduction in number of SMSes on their network but will benefit from the data plan that the user has to buy. To date, JaxtrSMS service has failed to replicate the success of Hotmail. Recently, he invested in email collaboration software, ccZen and another e-commerce technology provider E-junkie.

Personal life 
Bhatia is of Sindhi heritage. His father, Baldev Bhatia, was a captain in the Indian Army and his mother worked for the Central Bank of India. He did his schooling from Bishops School, Pune.

Bhatia married Tanya Sharma in 2008 and they have a daughter together. Later, they filed for divorce in January 2013 in a court in San Francisco, citing "irreconcilable differences".

References

Further reading 
 
 Bronson, Po, "HotMale: Sabeer Bhatia started his company on $300,000 and sold it two years later for $400 million. So, is he lucky, or great?", Wired, Issue 6.12, December 1999
 

1968 births
Living people
Businesspeople from Chandigarh
Indian emigrants to the United States
American computer scientists
American people of Indian descent
Apple Inc. employees
Indian company founders
American technology company founders
Hardware engineers
Birla Institute of Technology and Science, Pilani alumni
California Institute of Technology alumni
Stanford University alumni
American chief executives
Microsoft employees
Indian Hindus
American people of Sindhi descent
20th-century Indian engineers
21st-century American inventors